Seddera is a genus of plants in the bindweed family Convolvulaceae. There are currently 20 known species of the plant. Although it is mainly African, the plant extends to Arabia and India.

Species
The following species are recognised in the genus Seddera:

 Seddera arabica (Forssk.) Choisy
 Seddera bagshawei Rendle
 Seddera bracteata Verdc.
 Seddera capensis (E.Mey. ex Choisy) Hallier f.
 Seddera cinerea Hutch. & E.A.Bruce
 Seddera erlangeriana Engl. & Pilg.
 Seddera evolvuloides (Choisy) Wight
 Seddera glomerata (Balf.f.) O.Schwartz
 Seddera hadramautica R.R.Mill
 Seddera hallieri Engl. & Pilg.
 Seddera hirsuta Dammer ex Hallier f.
 Seddera humilis Hallier f.
 Seddera intermedia Hochst. & Steud.
 Seddera latifolia Hochst. & Steud.
 Seddera madagascariensis Deroin & Sebsebe
 Seddera micrantha Pilg.
 Seddera namibica Sebsebe
 Seddera ogadenensis Sebsebe
 Seddera pedunculata (Balf.f.) Verdc.
 Seddera repens Hallier f.
 Seddera retusa R.R.Mill
 Seddera rhodantha R.R.Mill
 Seddera schizantha  Hallier f.
 Seddera secundiflora  Jaub. & Spach
 Seddera semhahensis R.R.Mill
 Seddera simmonsii Verdc.
 Seddera suffruticosa (Schinz) Hallier f.
 Seddera velutina R.R.Mill
 Seddera virgata Hochst. & Steud.

References

 
Convolvulaceae genera
Taxonomy articles created by Polbot